Diapsids ("two arches") are a clade of sauropsids, distinguished from more primitive eureptiles by the presence of two holes, known as temporal fenestrae, in each side of their skulls. The group first appeared about three hundred million years ago during the late Carboniferous period. All diapsids other than the most primitive ones in the clade Araeoscelidia are sometimes placed into the clade Neodiapsida. The diapsids are extremely diverse, and include birds and all modern reptile groups, including turtles, which were historically thought to lie outside the group. Although some diapsids have lost either one hole (lizards), or both holes (snakes and turtles), or have a heavily restructured skull (modern birds), they are still classified as diapsids based on their ancestry. At least 17,084 species of diapsid animals are extant: 9,159 birds, and 7,925 snakes, lizards, tuatara, turtles, and crocodiles.

Characteristics

The name Diapsida means "two arches", and diapsids are traditionally classified based on their two ancestral skull openings (temporal fenestrae) posteriorly above and below the eye. This arrangement allows for the attachment of larger, stronger jaw muscles, and enables the jaw to open more widely. A more obscure ancestral characteristic is a relatively long lower arm bone (the radius) compared to the upper arm bone (humerus).

Classification
Diapsids were originally classified as one of four subclasses of the class Reptilia, all of which were based on the number and arrangement of openings in the skull. The other three subclasses were Synapsida (one opening low on the skull, for the "mammal-like reptiles"), Anapsida (no skull opening, including turtles and their relatives), and Euryapsida (one opening high on the skull, including many prehistoric marine reptiles). With the advent of phylogenetic nomenclature, this system of classification was heavily modified. Today, the synapsids are often not considered true reptiles, while Euryapsida were found to be an unnatural assemblage of diapsids that had lost one of their skull openings. Genetic studies and the discovery of the Triassic Pappochelys have shown that this is also the case in turtles, which are actually heavily modified diapsids. In phylogenetic systems, birds (descendants of traditional diapsid reptiles) are also considered to be members of this group.

Some modern studies of reptile relationships have preferred to use the name "diapsid" to refer to the crown group of all modern diapsid reptiles but not their extinct relatives. However, many researchers have also favored a more traditional definition that includes the prehistoric araeoscelidians. In 1991, Laurin defined Diapsida as a clade, "the most recent common ancestor of araeoscelidians, lepidosaurs, and archosaurs, and all its descendants".

A cladistic analysis by Laurin and Piñeiro (2017) recovers Parareptilia as part of Diapsida, with pareiasaurs, turtles, millerettids, and procolophinoids recovered as more derived than the basal diapsid Younginia. A 2020 study by David P. Ford and Roger B. J. Benson also recovered Parareptilia as deeply nested within Diapsida as the sister group to Neodiapsida, But this excludes mesosaurs, who were found to be basal among the sauropsids.

Relationships
Below is a cladogram showing the relations of the major groups of diapsids.

Cladogram after Bickelmann et al., 2009 and Reisz et al., 2011:

See also
 Vertebrate paleontology
 Synapsida
 Anapsida
 Euryapsida

References

External links

 
 Diapsida. Michel Laurin and Jacques A. Gauthier. Tree of Life Web Project. June 22, 2000.

 01
Reptile taxonomy

Reptiles of the United States
Extant Pennsylvanian first appearances
Taxa named by Henry Fairfield Osborn